Kocaköy can refer to:

 Kocaköy
 Kocaköy, Ayvacık
 Kocaköy, Çal